Elena Bissolati (born 10 January 1997) is an Italian professional racing cyclist who rides for Bepink.

Major Results
2017
GP von Deutschland im Sprint
2nd Team Sprint (with Miriam Vece
3rd Keirin

See also
 List of 2016 UCI Women's Teams and riders

References

External links
 

1997 births
Living people
Italian female cyclists
Place of birth missing (living people)
Cyclists from Cremona